Samuli Rasilainen (born 21 June 1996) is a Finnish retired ice hockey goaltender who played for Espoo Blues of the Finnish Liiga.

References

External links
 

1996 births
Living people
Espoo Blues players
Espoo United players
Finnish ice hockey goaltenders
Sportspeople from Oulu